The Olomouc Half Marathon is an annual half marathon race which takes place in June in Olomouc, Czech Republic. Known as the Mattoni Olomouc Half Marathon, it is a part of RunCzech running circuit. In 2013, it was awarded IAAF Silver Label Road Race status.

The course circumvents in two large loops city centre of Olomouc. The first edition of the event was held in 2010. In 2013, about 3 500 runners participated in the race.

Past winners

Key:

References

External links

 Olomouc Half Marathon official website

Half marathons
Athletics competitions in the Czech Republic
Recurring sporting events established in 2010
Olomouc
Summer events in the Czech Republic